Adelaide of Quedlinburg may refer to:

Adelaide I, Abbess of Quedlinburg (977–1044/5) 
Adelaide II, Abbess of Quedlinburg (1045–1096)